Adin Bukva (born 11 January 1998) is a Swedish footballer who plays as a forward for Italian club Gozzano.

Club career
In August 2018, he signed with Smedby AIS.

On 9 August 2019, he moved to the Italian third-tier Serie C club Gozzano. Bukva scored four goals in 20 matches during the 2019–20 season when Gozzano were relegated from Serie C.

In October 2020, Bukva was signed by Serie D club Follonica Gavorrano. He made only two appearances for the club in the fall of 2020. In September 2021, Bukva joined Serie D club Cittanova. After two months at the club, he moved on to Martina.

References

External links
Adin Bukva at Fotbolltransfers
 

1998 births
Living people
Swedish footballers
Sweden youth international footballers
Allsvenskan players
IFK Norrköping players
IF Sylvia players
Åtvidabergs FF players
A.C. Gozzano players
Serie C players
Swedish expatriate footballers
Expatriate footballers in Italy
Swedish expatriate sportspeople in Italy
Association football forwards
Sportspeople from Norrköping
U.S. Gavorrano players
A.S.D. Martina Calcio 1947 players
Serie D players
Footballers from Östergötland County